is a city located in Shimane Prefecture, Japan. As of March 1, 2017, the city has an estimated population of 38,875 and a population density of 92 persons per km².

History 
The ruins of Gassantoda Castle are in Yasugi.

According to legend, the goddess Izanami was buried here. In Shinto, both holy and negative concept exists.

The city was an ancient steel-making (tatara) center. The Yasugi Steel brand name bears the name of the city, and was established by Hitachi Metals, Ltd.

Yasugi was elevated to city status on April 4, 1954.

On October 1, 2004, the towns of Hakuta and Hirose (both from Nogi District) were merged into Yasugi.

Sightseeing

The Adachi Museum of Art has a widely known Japanese garden and a collection of contemporary Japanese paintings, comprising approximately 1,300 of the country's most highly regarded paintings produced after the Meiji period and centering on the works of Yokoyama Taikan. In 2021, the gardens of the Adachi Museum were ranked as the best in Japan for the 19th year in a row. There is a free shuttle between JR Yasugi Station and the museum (20 minutes).

Other sightseeing spots include:
 Soil scoop experience dojo place 
 Yasugi Bushi Art Center

Culture 
The city is known for Yasugibushi, a well-known folk song (Minyo) in Japan.

Infrastructure 
In June 2022, Shimane prefecture's governor Tatsuya Maruyama approved the restart of Unit 2 of the Chugoku Electric Power Company's nuclear power plant. Based in Matsue, Yasugi, along with Izumo and Unnan, all within 30 kilometers, approved the plan to restart of the boiling water reactor.

International relations

Twin towns — Sister cities
Yasugi is twinned with:
  Miryang, Gyeongsangnam-do, South Korea

References

External links

Yasugi City official website 
Adachi Museum of Art

Cities in Shimane Prefecture